Anke Wischnewski (born 5 January 1978 in Annaberg-Buchholz, Saxony) is a German former luger who has competed since 2001 to 2014. She won two medals in the women's singles at the FIL World Luge Championships with a silver in 2007 and a bronze in 2005.

Wischnewski's best finish at the FIL European Luge Championships in the women's singles event was third at Oberhof in 2013.

Her best finish in the overall Luge World Cup title was third in 2006-7.

Wishnewski qualified for the 2010 Winter Olympics where she finished fifth.

References
 FIL-Luge profile

External links 

 
 
 
 

1978 births
Living people
People from Annaberg-Buchholz
German female lugers
Lugers at the 2010 Winter Olympics
Lugers at the 2014 Winter Olympics
Olympic lugers of Germany
Sportspeople from Saxony